Duplex pullata is a moth of the family Erebidae first described by Michael Fibiger in 2010. It is known from the northern parts of Australia's Northern Territory and the north-eastern part of the state of Western Australia.

The wingspan is 10–11 mm. The forewing is relatively long. The crosslines are all present, often broken, black and waved. The terminal line is marked by dense black interneural spots. The hindwing is grey, without a discal spot and the underside of the forewing is grey, while the underside of the hindwing is grey, with an indistinct discal spot.

References

Micronoctuini
Taxa named by Michael Fibiger
Moths described in 2010